The 1991 NCAA Division I Men's Ice Hockey Tournament was the culmination of the 1990–91 NCAA Division I men's ice hockey season, the 44th such tournament in NCAA history. It was held between March 15 and March 30, 1991, and concluded with Northern Michigan defeating Boston University 8-7 in overtime. All First Round and Quarterfinals matchups were held at home team venues with the 'Frozen Four' games being played at the Saint Paul Civic Center in Saint Paul, Minnesota.

Qualifying teams
The NCAA permitted 12 teams to qualify for the tournament and divided its qualifiers into two regions (East and West). Each of the tournament champions from the four Division I conferences (CCHA, ECAC, Hockey East and WCHA) received automatic invitations into the tournament with At-large bids making up the remaining 8 teams. The NCAA permitted one Independent team to participate in the tournament and because the previous year the independent qualifier was placed in the East pool the two western conferences (CCHA and WCHA) would split only three open spots as opposed to the East's four open spots. The top four remaining eastern teams and the top three remaining western teams received invitations and were seeded with the automatic qualifiers according to their ranking.

Format
The tournament featured four rounds of play. The three odd-number ranked teams from one region were placed into a bracket with the three even-number ranked teams of the other region. The teams were then seeded according to their ranking with the top two teams in each bracket receiving byes into the quarterfinals. In the first round the third and sixth seeds and the fourth and fifth seeds played best-of-three series to determine which school advanced to the Quarterfinals with the winners of the 4 vs. 5 series playing the first seed and the winner of the 3 vs. 6 series playing the second seed. In the Quarterfinals the matches were best-of-three series once more with the victors advancing to the National Semifinals. Beginning with the Semifinals all games were played at the Saint Paul Civic Center and all series became Single-game eliminations. The winning teams in the semifinals advanced to the National Championship Game.

Tournament Bracket
Note: * denotes overtime period(s)

First round

(E3) Boston College vs. (W6) Alaska-Anchorage

(E4) Clarkson vs. (W5) Wisconsin

(W3) Michigan vs. (E6) Cornell

(W4) Minnesota vs. (E5) Providence

Quarterfinals

(E1) Maine vs. (W4) Minnesota

(E2) Boston University vs. (W3) Michigan

(W1) Lake Superior State vs. (E4) Clarkson

(W2) Northern Michigan vs. (W6) Alaska-Anchorage

Frozen Four

National Semifinal

(E1) Maine vs. (W2) Northern Michigan

(E2) Boston University vs. (E4) Clarkson

National Championship

(W2) Northern Michigan vs. (E2) Boston University

All-Tournament Team
G: Bill Pye (Northern Michigan)
D: Lou Melone (Northern Michigan)
D: Brad Werenka (Northern Michigan)
F: Tony Amonte (Boston University)
F: Scott Beattie* (Northern Michigan)
F: Jean-Yves Roy (Maine)
* Most Outstanding Player(s)

References

Tournament
NCAA Division I men's ice hockey tournament
NCAA Division I Men's Ice Hockey Tournament
NCAA Division I Men's Ice Hockey Tournament
NCAA Division I Men's Ice Hockey Tournament
NCAA Division I Men's Ice Hockey Tournament
NCAA Division I Men's Ice Hockey Tournament
NCAA Division I Men's Ice Hockey Tournament
NCAA Division I Men's Ice Hockey Tournament
1990s in Minneapolis
Ice hockey competitions in Boston
Ice hockey competitions in Maine
Ice hockey competitions in Michigan
Ice hockey competitions in Minneapolis
Ice hockey competitions in New York (state)
Ice hockey competitions in Saint Paul, Minnesota
Sports in Ann Arbor, Michigan
Marquette, Michigan
Sports in Orono, Maine
Sault Ste. Marie, Michigan
St. Lawrence County, New York